Isobo Jack is a Riverian businessman and politician of the All Progressives Congress who was the caretaker chairman of Akuku-Toru from December 2007 to April 2008. He is a member of the Kalabari tribe. He served as Chairman of the Rivers State Environmental Sanitation Authority between 2011 and 2012. He has also held the position of the Rivers State Commissioner of Urban Development.

References

Living people
Businesspeople from Rivers State
All Progressives Congress politicians
Heads of Rivers State government agencies and parastatals
Local politicians in Rivers State
Commissioners of ministries of Rivers State
Ijaw people
1964 births